Glaucocharis pauli is a moth in the family Crambidae. It was described by David E. Gaskin in 1985. It is found in Australia, where it has been recorded from Queensland and Dauan Island.

References

Diptychophorini
Moths described in 1985